Capital punishment is a legal penalty in Vietnam for a variety of crimes.

The Human Rights Measurement Initiative gives Vietnam a score of 4.4 out of 10 on the right to freedom from the death penalty, based on responses from human rights experts in the country. These experts have also identified that certain groups, such as migrants and/or immigrants, people with low social or economic status, and refugees or asylum seekers are particularly at risk of having their right to freedom from the death penalty violated. In 2020, these experts additionally identified "those involved in land disputes, particularly those involved with the Dong Tam Village attack" and "detainees or prisoners, particularly those convicted for drug offences or robberies" as especially vulnerable to death penalty executions.

Characteristics
Twenty-nine articles in the Penal Code allow the death penalty as an optional punishment. Executions were once carried out by a firing squad of seven police officers, where the prisoners were blindfolded and tied to stakes. The firing squad was replaced by lethal injection in November 2011 after the Law on Execution of Criminal Judgments (in article 59(1)) was passed by the National Assembly of Vietnam. The drugs used to execute prisoners are produced domestically. The first execution conducted by lethal injection was of Nguyen Anh Tuan, convicted of murdering gas station employee Bui Thi Nguyet on August 6, 2013.  

In November 2015, a revision of the Penal Code that severely curtailed the death penalty was passed. Under the new regulations, which took effect on July 1, 2016, the death penalty was abolished for seven crimes: surrendering to the enemy, opposing order, destruction of projects of national security importance, robbery, drug possession, drug appropriation, and the production and trade of fake food. In addition, those 75 or older are exempt, and officials convicted of corruption charges can be spared if they pay back at least 75% of the profits they illicitly obtained.

The death penalty cannot be applied to juvenile offenders, pregnant women, and women nursing children under 36 months old at the time the crime was committed or being tried. These cases are commuted to life imprisonment.

Between August 6, 2013 and June 30, 2016, Vietnam executed 429 people. 1,134 people were sentenced to death between July 2011 and June 2016. The number of individuals on death row is not known.

Crimes carrying capital punishment in Vietnam
According to the Penal Code, the following chapters contain the relevant articles that apply to capital punishment.

See also 
Crime in Vietnam
Law of Vietnam

References

Penal Code No. 100/2015/QH13

Sources
capitalpunishmentuk

Vietnam
Murder in Vietnam
Law of Vietnam
Human rights abuses in Vietnam